Kurt Katch (born Isser Kac; January 28, 1893 – August 14, 1958) was a Polish film and television actor.  He appeared in Quiet Please, Murder, The Purple V, The Mask of Dimitrios, Ali Baba and the Forty Thieves, among many others. Katch appeared in  the first James Bond story filmed (Casino Royale) in 1954 for the Climax! t.v. show. Katch died from cancer and is interred at Eden Memorial Park Cemetery in Los Angeles.

Selected filmography

Die Sekretärin des Gesandten (1919)
Die geheimnisvolle Kugel (1919) - Wucherer Rascon Balthasar
The Mexican (1919)
Das Lied der Nornen (1919) - Sado
Der Todesbote (1920)
Ihr tollster Trick (1920) - Tom Gibson, Maler
Das offene Grab (1921)
Die Apotheke des Teufels (1921) - Charley
Ein ungeklärter Fall (1921)
The Hotel in Chicago (1921) - Manuele
Wildnis (1922)
Zwischen Tag und Traum (1922) - Mac Duffre
Quarantine (1923) - Hafenarzt
Der Sohn des Galeerensträftlings (1923) - Der Dicke
Dudu, a Human Destiny (1924)
Die Räuberbande (1928)
Das Land ohne Frauen (1929) - Goldminer
The League of Three (1929) - Morris
Al khet (1936) - Prof. Levin
Tkies khaf (1937) - Mendl Feld
Ludzie Wisly (1938)
Man at Large (1941) - Hans Brinker, First Victim
Don Winslow of the Navy (1942) - The Scorpion
Secret Agent of Japan (1942) - Traeger
The Wife Takes a Flyer (1942) - Capt. Schmutnick (uncredited)
Berlin Correspondent (1942) - Weiner
Counter-Espionage (1942) - Gustav Soessel
Desperate Journey (1942) - Hesse (uncredited)
Quiet Please, Murder (1942) - Eric Pahsen
The Purple V (1943) - Johann Keller
Edge of Darkness (1943) - German Captain (uncredited)
Mission to Moscow (1943) - Gen. Semen Timoshenko (uncredited)
They Came to Blow Up America (1943) - Schonzeit
Background to Danger (1943) - Mailler
Secret Service in Darkest Africa (1943, Serial) - Kurt Hauptmann [Ch. 1]
Watch on the Rhine (1943) - Herr Blecher
The Strange Death of Adolf Hitler (1943) - Corp. Karl Frobe
Ali Baba and the Forty Thieves (1944) - Hulagu Khan
The Purple Heart (1944) - Ludwig Kruger (uncredited)
Make Your Own Bed (1944) - Herr von Ritter
The Mask of Dimitrios (1944) - Colonel Haki
The Seventh Cross (1944) - Leo Hermann
The Conspirators (1944) - Otto Lutzke
The Mummy's Curse (1944) - Cajun Joe
Salome Where She Danced (1945) - Count Von Bismarck
Rendezvous 24 (1946) - Dr. Heligmann
Angel on My Shoulder (1946) - Warden in Hell (uncredited)
Strange Journey (1946) - Horst
Song of Love (1947) - Judge
Secret of the Incas (1954) - Man with Rifle
The Adventures of Hajji Baba (1954) - Caoush (uncredited)
Abbott and Costello Meet the Mummy (1955) - Dr. Zoomer
Never Say Goodbye (1956) - Landlord (uncredited)
Hot Cars (1956) - Otto Krantz (uncredited)
Pharaoh's Curse (1957) - Hans Brecht
The Girl in the Kremlin (1957) - Commissar
The Gift of Love (1958) - Lecturing Professor (uncredited)
The Beast of Budapest (1958) - Sgt. Geza
The Young Lions (1958) - Camp Commandant (uncredited)
When Hell Broke Loose (1958) - German 'Werewolf' (uncredited) (final film role)

References

External links

1890s births
1958 deaths
Russian male film actors
Russian male television actors
Russian people of Jewish descent
Jewish Polish male actors
People from Grodno
Polish expatriates in the United States
Expatriate male actors in the United States
Burials at Eden Memorial Park Cemetery